Leonia High School is a four-year comprehensive public high school serving students in ninth through twelfth grade from the Borough of Leonia in Bergen County, New Jersey, United States, operating as part of the Leonia Public Schools. Students from Edgewater attend the school as part of a sending/receiving relationship with the Edgewater Public Schools.

As of the 2021–22 school year, the school had an enrollment of 867 students and 67.5 classroom teachers (on an FTE basis), for a student–teacher ratio of 12.8:1. There were 117 students (13.5% of enrollment) eligible for free lunch and 23 (2.7% of students) eligible for reduced-cost lunch.

History
Constructed at a cost of $65,000 (equal to $ million in ), the district's original high school facility opened in April 1912 and had its cornerstone laid at ceremonies held in December of that year.

The school opened at its current location in January 1977, after multiple issues with subcontractors led to several delays from the original planned opening in September at the start of the school year. Constructed at a cost of $4.5 million (equivalent to $ million in ) and offering 50% more space than its predecessor, the building served 650 students, including 140 from Edgewater.

Awards, recognition and rankings
In the 2011 "Ranking America's High Schools" issue by The Washington Post, the school was ranked 14th in New Jersey and 657th nationwide.

The school was the 94th-ranked public high school in New Jersey out of 339 schools statewide in New Jersey Monthly magazine's September 2014 cover story on the state's "Top Public High Schools", using a new ranking methodology. The school had been ranked 52nd in the state of 328 schools in 2012, after being ranked 49th in 2010 out of 322 schools listed. The magazine ranked the school 51st in 2008 out of 316 schools. The school was ranked 67th in the magazine's September 2006 issue, which included 316 schools across the state.

Schooldigger.com ranked the school as 174th out of 376 public high schools statewide in its 2010 rankings (a decrease of 4 positions from the 2009 rank) which were based on the combined percentage of students classified as proficient or above proficient on the language arts literacy and mathematics components of the High School Proficiency Assessment (HSPA).

Niche Ranked the school 35th of 406 on its list of Best College Prep Public High Schools in New Jersey and 69th of 425 in its ranking of Best Public High Schools.

In 2021, U.S. News & World Report ranked the school 56th in New Jersey, 156th in the New York City metropolitan area and 1,331st nationwide.

Extracurricular activities
In 1957, the school's chess team was the New Jersey high school team champion, winning the Father Casimir J. Finley Trophy.

Academic competition
Leonia has had an active quiz bowl team for decades. In April 2017, Leonia won the Junior Varsity National Championship title for the Small School Division of the National History Bowl, led by Nathan Finn, who was the 2016 Junior Varsity New Jersey History Bee State Champion.

Athletics
The Leonia High School Lions participate in the North Jersey Interscholastic Conference, which is comprised of small-enrollment schools in Bergen, Hudson, Morris and Passaic counties, and was created following a reorganization of sports leagues in Northern New Jersey by the New Jersey State Interscholastic Athletic Association (NJSIAA). Prior to the realignment that took effect in the fall of 2010, Leonia was a member of the Bergen County Scholastic League Olympic Division. With 505 students in grades 10-12, the school was classified by the NJSIAA for the 2019–20 school year as Group II for most athletic competition purposes, which included schools with an enrollment of 486 to 758 students in that grade range.

The school participates as the host school / lead agency for joint cooperative girls soccer, boys / girls swimming and wrestling teams with Palisades Park High School, while Palisades Park is the host school for a co-op football team. These co-op programs operate under agreements scheduled to expire at the end of the 2023–24 school year.

The boys track team won the Group II spring track state championship in 1961.

The 1967 boys basketball team used its height to its advantage and defeated Burlington Township High School by a score of 73-65 in the Group I tournament final to finish the season with a record of 20-4.

The girls tennis team won the Group I state championship in 2002 (defeating New Providence High School in the tournament final) and 2019 (vs. Glen Rock High School). The 2019 team used wins in all three singles matches to win the Group I finals against Glen Rock.

Leonia football, which is a co-op program with Palisades Park High School, became the first cooperative program to have reached a finals game in state history when the team made the North Jersey II Group III state championship game in 2012, falling to Summit High School by a 30–0 final score. The team finished 9–3 which was the most wins in Leonia school history, and Head Coach David Schuman was awarded NJIC coach of the year and The Record ranked the team 12th in North Jersey.

Administration
The principal is Charles Kalender. His administration team includes the vice principal and athletic director.

Notable alumni

 Elizabeth Baranger (1927–2019, class of 1945), physicist and academic administrator at the University of Pittsburgh, whose research concerned shell model calculations in nuclear physics.
 Barbara Corcoran (born 1949, class of 1967), real estate investor and agent.
 Toomas Hendrik Ilves (born 1953), class of 1972, President of Estonia (Eesti Vabariigi president).
 Lim Kim (born 1994), South Korean musical artist.
 Bob Klapisch, sportswriter.
 David Klass screenwriter and novelist who has written more than 40 Hollywood screenplays and published 14 young adult novels.
 Vera Maxwell (1901–1995), fashion designer.
 David Mansfield (born 1956), rock musician.
 Christiane Noll (born 1968), singer and actress known for her work in musicals and on the concert stage.
 Nick Prisco (1909–1981), football tailback who played one season in the NFL with the Philadelphia Eagles.
 Ivory Sully (born 1957), former NFL cornerback who played for nine seasons, mostly with the Los Angeles Rams.

References

External links
Leonia High School
Leonia Public Schools
Leonia Alumni Network

School Data for the Leonia Public Schools, National Center for Education Statistics

Edgewater, New Jersey
Leonia, New Jersey
Public high schools in Bergen County, New Jersey